Dark at the End of the Tunnel  is the seventh studio album by American new wave band Oingo Boingo, released in 1990.

Music
Dark at the End of the Tunnel marked Oingo Boingo's move toward a more pure pop sound, eschewing the hyper, frantic style exemplified on previous records for a more mainstream, less formally innovative approach, with an emphasis on emotional, positive lyrics.

By the time of the album's recording, frontman Danny Elfman had become a famed film composer, particularly in collaboration with Tim Burton. Two tracks on the album had previously emerged on movie soundtracks: an early recording of "Try to Believe" first appeared as an instrumental during end credits of the 1988 film Midnight Run (scored by Elfman), and a vocal version, attributed to "Mosley & The B-Men", was released on the film's soundtrack album; similarly, a different mix of "Flesh 'N Blood" had first appeared in the 1989 film Ghostbusters II and on its soundtrack.

"When the Lights Go Out" peaked at No. 15 on the Billboard Alternative Songs chart in March 1990.

Artwork
The cover art of the album depicts a portion of a painting entitled "Volcano", by artist Peter Zokosky.

A promotional version of the album was released on a vinyl picture disc, with one side featuring the album cover and the other side featuring a color photograph of the band.

Reissue
In 2022, Rubellan Remasters announced that they would be issuing a remastered version of Dark at the End of the Tunnel on both colored vinyl and CD, the latter as an expanded edition with four bonus tracks.

Track listing

Personnel

Oingo Boingo
 Danny Elfman – vocals
 John Avila – bass guitar, vocals
 Steve Bartek – guitars
 Carl Graves – keyboards, vocals
 Johnny "Vatos" Hernandez – drums, percussion
 Sam Phipps – tenor and soprano saxophones
 Leon Schneiderman – baritone sax
 Dale Turner – trumpet

Additional musicians
 Bruce Fowler – trombone
 Ralph Grierson – piano
 Kenny Kotwitz – accordion
 Brian Mann – accordion
 Yvonne S. Moriarity – French horn
 Maxine Waters – additional vocals ("Try to Believe")
 Julia Waters – additional vocals ("Try to Believe")

Technical
 Chris Lord-Alge – mixing
 Talley Sherwood – second engineer
 Bill Jackson – engineer
 Jeff Lord-Alge – engineer
 Jim Scott – additional engineering
 Csaba Petocz – additional engineering
 Brian Soucy – assistant engineer
 David Cragin – studio assistant
 Greg Fulginiti – mastering
 Vartan – art direction
 DZN, The Design Group – design
 Dennis Keeley – photography

References

Oingo Boingo albums
Albums produced by John Avila
Albums produced by Danny Elfman
Albums produced by Steve Bartek
1990 albums